Indrek Pertelson (born 21 April 1971) is an Estonian judoka. At the 2000 and 2004 Summer Olympics he won bronze medals in the men's Heavyweight (+100 kg) category. He was born in Tallinn.

References

External links
 
 
 
 
 
 

1971 births
Living people
Estonian male judoka
Olympic judoka of Estonia
Olympic bronze medalists for Estonia
Judoka at the 1992 Summer Olympics
Judoka at the 1996 Summer Olympics
Judoka at the 2000 Summer Olympics
Judoka at the 2004 Summer Olympics
Sportspeople from Tallinn
Olympic medalists in judo
Medalists at the 2004 Summer Olympics
Medalists at the 2000 Summer Olympics
Goodwill Games medalists in judo
Competitors at the 1994 Goodwill Games
20th-century Estonian people
21st-century Estonian people